Berle M. Schiller (born 1944) is a Senior United States district judge of the United States District Court for the Eastern District of Pennsylvania.

Education and career

Born in Brooklyn, New York, Schiller received a Bachelor of Arts degree from Bowdoin College in 1965 and a Juris Doctor from New York University School of Law in 1968. He was in private practice of law in Pennsylvania from 1968 to 1969. He was a Deputy attorney general of Pennsylvania Department of Justice in 1971, returning to private practice from 1972 to 1993. He was a chief counsel to the Federal Transit Administration from 1994 to 1996, and was an appellate judge on the Superior Court of Pennsylvania from 1996 to 2000.

Federal judicial service

On April 11, 2000, Schiller was nominated by President Bill Clinton to a seat on the United States District Court for the Eastern District of Pennsylvania vacated by Robert S. Gawthrop III. Schiller was confirmed by the United States Senate on May 24, 2000, and received his commission on June 2, 2000. He assumed senior status on June 18, 2012.

Schiller is well-known for his passion for hunting using a bow and arrow. He has traveled around the world doing so. His office in his chambers is festooned with many trophies on the wall.

See also
List of Jewish American jurists
List of Bowdoin College people
List of NYU Law School people

References

Sources

1944 births
Living people
Bowdoin College alumni
Judges of the United States District Court for the Eastern District of Pennsylvania
New York University School of Law alumni
People from Brooklyn
Superior court judges in the United States
United States district court judges appointed by Bill Clinton
20th-century American judges
21st-century American judges